Letters from Fire is the debut album of Norwegian gothic metal band The Crest. It mainly features re-worked songs from the band's previous demos.

Track listing
"Fire Walk with Me"
"Butterflies & Dragons"
"Thorn"
"Never Sleep Again"
"Childhood's End"
"Pills for Broken Dreams"
"In This Cage"
"Triangle"
"Frozen Garden"
"Monument"
"Armada"

Line up
 Nell Sigland - Vocals, keyboards
 Kristian Sigland - Guitars, vocals, keyboards, programming
 Magnus Westgaard - Bass, vocals
 Sebastian Aarebrot - Guitars
 Xander Sevon - Drums, drum programming

References

Review by Metal.de
Review by Rockhard.de
Review by Sonic Cathedral
Review by Nightfall in Metal Earth
Review by Metal Storm
Review by Metalreviews.com

2002 albums
The Crest (band) albums
Season of Mist albums